John Denny Vesey, 1st Baron Knapton (died 1761), was an Anglo-Irish politician and peer.

Vesey was the son of Sir Thomas Vesey, 1st Baronet, and his wife and cousin Mary Muschamp, only surviving daughter and heiress of Denny Muschamp of Horsley, Surrey, and his wife Elizabeth Boyle, daughter of Michael Boyle, Archbishop of Armagh.

In 1727 he was elected to the Irish House of Commons as the Member of Parliament for Newtownards, holding the seat until 1750. On 6 August 1730, he succeeded to his father's baronetcy. On 10 April 1750 he was elevated to the peerage as Baron Knapton, in the Queen's County, in the Peerage of Ireland, and he assumed his seat in the Irish House of Lords.

He married Elizabeth Brownlow, daughter of William Brownlow. He was succeeded in his titles by his eldest son, Thomas Vesey, who was made Viscount de Vesci in 1776. His daughter Elizabeth married Edmund Pery, 1st Viscount Pery, and another daughter Anne married Thomas Knox, 1st Viscount Northland.

References

Year of birth unknown
1761 deaths
18th-century Anglo-Irish people
Barons in the Peerage of Ireland
Irish MPs 1727–1760
Members of the Irish House of Lords
Members of the Parliament of Ireland (pre-1801) for County Down constituencies
Peers of Ireland created by George II